RTL (previously known as RTL Televizija) is a Croatian free-to-air television network founded on 30 April 2004. It was owned by the RTL Group from 2004 to 2022. Since 1 June 2022, it is owned by the CME Group. The logo consists of three primary colours: Red, Yellow, and Blue.

This is the second commercial television network in Croatia that has a national concession, following Nova TV.

On 15 May 2014, RTL Group announced that Henning Tewes, Managing Director of news provider Enex, would be appointed Chief Executive Officer (CEO) of RTL Hrvatska as of 1 July 2014. Tewes succeeds Johannes Züll, who left the RTL Group to become president and CEO of Studio Hamburg. As a result of a proposal from Henning Tewes, Ivan Lovreček, former editor-in-chief and member of the Executive Board of RTL Hrvatska, was promoted to Deputy CEO of the company on 1 July 2014.

The blocks got a three dimensional design on 16 September 2015. Mein RTL would be used in some certain idents.

On 12 November 2019, as part of a nationwide transition to the DVB-T2 broadcast standard among all Croatian broadcasters, the channel including with RTL 2, RTL Kockica, RTL Passion, RTL Living, and RTL Crime launched their HD feeds.

On 20 December 2019, a month later, RTL debuted a new flat logo and graphics package that replaced the Phoenica font (used by RTL's parent channel in its on-air appearance) with the well-known FF DIN font. As of now, its slogan is “Više od Televizije” (More than Television).

On 15 September 2021, the German version of RTL was relaunched with a new multi-colored logo. It was confirmed that the new logo would debut in Croatia sometime in the near future.

On 14 February 2022, it was announced that RTL Group reached an agreement with Central European Media Enterprises for the sale of RTL Hrvatska. On 1 June 2022, the transaction of RTL Hrvatska to CME had been completed.

Programming

In-house production 

In addition to its own daily news programming, RTL Televizija broadcasts its own news program each day. During the week, RTL Vijesti broadcasts at 16:30 on Monday to Thursday RTL Vijesti at 16:30 and RTL Danas at 18:30 CET, followed by RTL Direkt at 22:15 CET with late news and current affairs. During the weekend, two news programs are transmitted, RTL Vijesti at 16:30 and RTL Danas at 18:30.

Throughout its existence, the station has created its own programming, including the daily talk show Sanja, a dating game show called Srcolovka, a quiz show called Veto, an entertainment show called Salto, a talk show called Retromanija, a daily soap opera called Zabranjena ljubav (Forbidden Love), Exploziv and Exkluziv magazines, which later became Exkluziv Tabloid. The Croatian version of Big Brother was also produced by RTL Televizija, at the time the most popular television program in Croatia. They also started producing a sitcom called Bibin svijet (Biba's World) in 2006. Among the shows is talk show Studio 45, the dramatic series Ne daj se, Nina!,  Krv nije voda, and K.T.2, Policijska patrola, with Život nogometaša and Moja 3 zida, Top Model by Tatjana Juri, as well as culinary shows Večera za 5, as well as Punom Parom. A few of the shows she has produced recently include Pobijedi Šolu, Kriza sitcom, a co-production with FIST productions, quiz show, Pet na pet, game shows, Tko će ga znati! and Tog se nitko nije sjetio!, docu-soap, Ljubav je na selu, drama series Ruža vjetrova, Tajne, Vatre ivanjske, music show, Hrvatski broj jedan, culinary shows, Kuhar i pol, Tri, dva, jedan - peci!, Tri, dva, jedan - kuhaj!, magazine show, Sve u šest and music show, X Factor Adria, co-production of with Prva Srpska Televizija. The music show, Zvijezde has been running since 2018.

Some of the other popular reality shows from their own production included Dvornikovi (The Dvornik Family), a 2006 series similar to The Osbournes and featuring the family of the late Croatian musician Dino Dvornik, Knjaz's entertainment shows Mjenjačnica, Koledžicom po svijetu, Najveći hrvatski misteriji. Mijenjam ženu was the Croatian version of Wife Swap.

Sports

Throughout all of its daily news programs, RTL Televizija has broadcast daily sports news throughout all of its daily news programs. Throughout all of its daily news programs, RTL Televizija has broadcast daily sports news throughout all of its daily news programs. The Croatian national football team used to broadcast its away matches there between 2004 and 2007. Since 2008, HRT has been broadcasting these matches once again.

RTL Televizija occasionally also broadcast boxing bouts and the highlights of the Red Bull Air Race events. They also bought the TV rights for all the matches of the 2009 World Men's Handball Championship, which was held in Croatia. This proved to be a big hit to Croatia's public broadcaster HRT, who even threatened to take legal action against RTL after they refused to sell them the rights to broadcast the match highlights during their news programs.

Audience share 
2004 :7.3%
2005:6.2%
2006:5.9%
2007:5.3%
2008:5.1%
2009:4.4%
2010:4.2%
2011:4.3%
2012:3.2%
2013:4.2%
2014:4.4%
2015:2.2%
2016:2.2%
2017:6.3%
2018:7.3%

Audience share (target: 18–49)

 2004 : 29.5%
 2005 : 28.6%
 2006 : 28.6%
 2008 : 26.4%
 2009 : 26.2%
 2010 : 26.1%
 2011 : 26.4%
 2015 : 13,4%

Advertising share
The following information is from 

 2004 : 16.3%
 2005 : 38.4%
 2006 : 42.9%

References

External links
 

Television channels in Croatia
Television channels in North Macedonia
RTL Group
Television channels and stations established in 2004
2004 establishments in Croatia
Mass media in Zagreb
Croatian-language television stations